The 1890–91 FA Cup was the 20th edition of the world's oldest football knockout competition, The Football Association Challenge Cup, or FA Cup.

Qualifying rounds
For information on the matches played from the preliminary round to the fourth qualifying round, see 1890–91 FA Cup qualifying rounds.

First round proper

Replays

Second round proper

Replays

Third round proper

Semi finals

Replay

Final

References

 FA Cup Results Archive

 
FA Cup seasons